The Evolve Tag Team Championship was a professional wrestling tag team championship owned by the Evolve promotion. The inaugural champions were crowned on January 24, 2016, at the end of an eight-team tournament.

Like most professional wrestling championships, the title was won as a result of a scripted match. There have been 13 reigns shared among 12 teams and 21 wrestlers.

History
Evolve was founded in 2009 by Dragon Gate USA (DGUSA) booker Gabe Sapolsky, Full Impact Pro (FIP) owner Sal Hamaoui and independent wrestler Davey Richards and held its first event on January 16, 2010. On November 25, 2011, Evolve and DGUSA announced the unification of the two promotions, which would result in Evolve recognizing the Open the Freedom Gate and Open the United Gate Championships as its top two titles. On December 22, 2014, WWNLive, the parent company of both Evolve and DGUSA, announced it was putting DGUSA on hiatus until it could secure more Japanese wrestlers for the promotion's shows. The Open the United Gate Championship continued being defended at Evolve shows until May 30, 2015, when reigning champions Johnny Gargano and Rich Swann retired the title and asked for a new Evolve tag team title to be created in its place. On September 22, Evolve announced that it would start putting more emphasis on the promotion's tag team division and would create the new title, if the experiment turned out successful. On November 10, 2015, Evolve sent out a press release, officially announcing the creation of the Evolve Tag Team Championship.

Championship tournament
Evolve announced that the inaugural champions would be determined in a tournament taking place over Evolve 53, Evolve 54 and Evolve 55 from January 22 to 24, 2016, in Orlando, Florida. The first three teams participating in the tournament were revealed in the press release announcing the creation of the title. The rest of the teams were announced throughout the rest of November 2015 along with the clarification that the tournament would be contested in a single-elimination format with eight participating teams. The first round matches were announced on January 19, 2016. Timothy Thatcher was originally announced for the tournament, but he was forced to pull out due to a staph infection and was replaced by Sami Callihan.

Participating teams
The Bravado Brothers (Harlem Bravado and Lancelot Bravado)
Catch Point (Drew Gulak and T. J. Perkins)
Heroes. Eventually. Die. (Chris Hero and Tommy End)
Drew Galloway and Johnny Gargano
The Premier Athlete Brand (Anthony Nese and Caleb Konley)
Roppongi Vice (Rocky Romero and Trent Baretta)
Sami Callihan and Zack Sabre Jr.
Team Tremendous (Bill Carr and Dan Barry)

Title history

Combined reigns

By wrestler

See also
Evolve Championship
Open the United Gate Championship

References

External links
Official Evolve website
 EVOLVE Tag Team Championship

Evolve (professional wrestling) championships
WWNLive championships
Tag team wrestling championships